HMS Grafton was a 74-gun third-rate ship of the line of the Royal Navy, built by Adam Hayes launched on 26 September 1771 at Deptford Dockyard. One of the largest ships in the navy she had a crew of 550 men.

Service History

May, 1778 under command of Capt. Andrew Wilkinson.

In 1779 she fought at the head of the British line at the Battle of Grenada, and in 1780 she was part of Rodney's fleet at the Battle of Martinique.

From 1792 Grafton was on harbour service, and she was broken up in 1816.

Notable Commanders

Captain Thomas Collingwood briefly in 1779
Captain William Affleck briefly in 1780
Captain Frederick Lewis Maitland briefly in 1782
Captain Stair Douglas briefly in 1782
Sir John Hamilton 1782/3

Citations and notes

References

 Lavery, Brian (2003) The Ship of the Line - Volume 1: The development of the battlefleet 1650-1850. Conway Maritime Press. .

External links
 

Ships built in Deptford
Albion-class ships of the line (1763)
1771 ships